Robert Asaro-Angelo is an American labor leader and commissioner of the New Jersey Department of Labor and Workforce Development.

Biography
Asaro-Angelo was raised in a union family and is a son of a longtime Atlantic City labor organizer. From 2010 until 2017, he was Eastern Regional Representative for the U.S. Department of Labor, where he managed the department's regional activities and coordinated federal efforts on the regional, state and local levels. He also served on intergovernmental work groups such as the White House Hurricane Sandy Task Force, White House Task Force on Puerto Rico, Regional U.S. Interagency Councils on Homeless and FEMA's Recovery Support Function Leadership Group.

He also has worked for the Laborers International Union of North America (LiUNA), AFSCME, and 1199SEIU United Healthcare Workers East. He served as executive director of the New Jersey Democratic State Committee in 2008, during the transition of Bush to Obama, when Senator Joe Cryan served as state party chairman.

He holds a Bachelor of Science in Communications from Boston University and a Masters in Public Policy from the Eagleton Institute of Politics at Rutgers University.

In January 2018, New Jersey Governor Phil Murphy nominated Asaro-Angelo for Commissioner of Labor and Workforce Development. He was confirmed by the New Jersey Senate on March 26, 2018, on a 38–0 vote.

In February 2021, Governor Murphy appointed Asaro-Angelo Co-Chair of the New Jersey Council on the Green Economy.

Asaro-Angelo lives in East Brunswick, New Jersey.

Citations 

1977 births
People from East Brunswick, New Jersey
State cabinet secretaries of New Jersey
State labor commissioners in the United States
United States Department of Labor officials
Rutgers University alumni
Politicians from Atlantic City, New Jersey
Trade unionists from New Jersey
New Jersey Democrats
American Federation of State, County and Municipal Employees people
Service Employees International Union people
Boston University College of Communication alumni
Living people